Kurtziella tachnodes, common name the wreath mangelia, is a species of sea snail, a marine gastropod mollusk in the family Mangeliidae.

Description
The length of the shell attains 7.5 mm, its diameter 2.2 mm.

Distribution
K. tachnodes can be found in the Gulf of Mexico, off Florida; in the Atlantic Ocean off Georgia

References

External links
  Tucker, J.K. 2004 Catalog of recent and fossil turrids (Mollusca: Gastropoda). Zootaxa 682:1–1295.

tachnodes
Gastropods described in 1927